The Mountainous Republic of the Northern Caucasus (MRNC; also known as the United Republics of the North Caucasus, Mountain Republic or the Republic of the Mountaineers) was a country in the North Caucasus formed by the unification of Circassians, Chechens, Ingush, Ossetians and Dagestanis proclaimed at the congress of the North Caucasian peoples on 6 March 1917. It existed from 1917 until 1922.

MRNC included most of the territory of the former Terek Oblast and Dagestan Oblast of the Russian Empire, which now form the republics of Chechnya, Ingushetia, North Ossetia–Alania, Kabardino-Balkaria, Dagestan, Abkhazia and part of Stavropol Krai of the Russian Federation. Its capital was initially at Vladikavkaz, then Nazran, and finally Temir-Khan-Shura.

It broke away from the Russian Empire during the February Revolution, shortly before the start of the Russian Civil War. The state was captured by Soviet Russian forces in 1921, who transformed it into the Mountain Autonomous Soviet Socialist Republic.

State formation 
The Union included seven "states" allocated on a national basis and united according to a confederative principle in the territories: Dagestan, Ingushetia, Chechnya, Ossetia, Circassia (Including West Circassia but the union only had control over East Circassia), Karachay-Balkaria, the Nogai steppes and also claims in Abkhazia.

The Cabinet of Ministers of the Mountain Republic included representatives from almost all regions of the North Caucasus.

History 
The Union of the Peoples of the Northern Caucasus was created in March 1917, and an Executive Committee of the Union was elected. The Chairman of the Executive Committee was one of the leaders of the National‐Liberation movement of the Peoples of the Northern Caucasus, Tapa Tchermoeff. The 1847 constitution of Imam Shamil was re-adopted on 5 August 1917 by the Central Committee of the Northern Caucasus.

The independent republic was officially proclaimed on 11 May 1918, after the collapse of the Russian Tsarist empire in the Russian revolution of 1917. The government of the new republic was established. Prime Minister Tapa Tchermoeff, Rashid-khan Kaplanov and Haidar Bammate. The Republic's capital was Vladikavkaz, later moved to Temir-Khan-Shura. The republic was supported by Said Shamil (grandson of Imam Shamil). The Mountainous Republic was de jure recognized by the Ottoman Empire, Germany, the Azerbaijan Democratic Republic, Armenia, the Democratic Republic of Georgia, Ukraine, Bulgaria, Belarus, Latvia, Estonia, France, Finland, the United Kingdom of Great Britain and Ireland, the United States, Italy, Austria-Hungary, Poland, the Don Republic, Japan, and the Kuban People's Republic.

Early in March 1919, General Tapa Tchermoeff and Ibrahim Bey Gaydarov headed a delegation to Paris in an attempt to take part in the Treaty of Versailles. The object of the delegation was to secure the recognition of the independence of the Mountainous Republic of the Northern Caucasus.

The 1st and 2nd Dagestan cavalry regiments from the Caucasian Native Cavalry Division declared loyalty to the Mountainous Republic and Ottoman Pashas of Circassian origin came with their armies to support the new founded state. Therefore, an army with experienced soldiers and commanders was established. North Caucasian soldiers engaged in fierce clashes against the invading White troops of General Anton Denikin's Volunteer Army. The Caucasus was completely taken from Soviet Russia with the support of the North Caucasus Army under the command of Yusuf Izzet Pasha. 

In connection with the defeat of Germany and Turkey in the First World War and the withdrawal of Turkish troops from Transcaucasia and Dagestan, the Mountain government was reorganized, and at the end of 1918 the Mountain Congress in Temir-Khan-Shura approved Pshemaho Kotsev as the head of the coalition cabinet. The fighting ended in January 1920, when Denikin's army was completely defeated by the 11th Red Army. In January 1921, the MRNC was completely occupied by the Red Army of Bolshevik Russia and the government of the republic was forced to leave the Caucasus. In January 1921, the Soviet Mountain Republic of the Russian SFSR was established.

Prominent government figures, 1917–1919

See also 
 
 Caucasian Imamate (1828–1859)
 North Caucasian Soviet Republic (1918)
 Mountain Autonomous Soviet Socialist Republic (1921–1924)
 Confederation of Mountain Peoples of the Caucasus (1989–2000)
 Prometheism

Notes

Bibliography

 "Caucasian Republic Mission to the Peace Conference Appeal for Help", The Morning Post, London, Friday 4 April 1919.
 J. "Obedinennyi Kavkaz" ("Vereinigtes Kaukasien"), 1–3 (30–32), München, 1954.  
 Baddeley, J. F., 1908, The Russian Conquest of the Caucasus, Longmans, Green, and Co., London
 Madeleine Henrey, Madeleine Grown Up, J. M. Dent & Sons, London, 1954.
 Kathleen R. Jackson, Marat Fidarov, Essays on the History of the North Caucasus, HHN Media, New York, 2009.
 
 
 Storozhenko (ed.), Ingushetia and Chechen Republic Map, Northern Caucasian Aerogeodesic Company of Roskartografia, Russia, 1995.
 Levan Z. Urushadze, "About the history of the question of unity of the Caucasian Peoples". J. "Amirani", XIII, Montreal‐Tbilisi, 2005, pp. 72–87.
 «Союз горцев Северного Кавказа и Горская республика. История несостоявшегося государства. 1917-1920», М.М. Вачагаев, 2018

States and territories established in 1917
States and territories disestablished in 1922
Post–Russian Empire states
History of the North Caucasus
Chechen-speaking countries and territories
Former countries of the interwar period
1917 establishments in Europe
1922 disestablishments in Europe